Alberto J. Safra (born 1979/1980) is a Brazilian-born businessman who founded ASA Investments and is a member of the Safra family.

Biography
He graduated from the Wharton School of Business. and then went to work for his father where he shared responsibility for Banco Safra in Brazil with his younger brother David (Alberto was responsible for corporate banking while David was responsible for investment banking). His brother Jacob managed the Safra group's international operations (Safra National Bank of New York and J. Safra Sarasin of Switzerland). In 2012, his father acquired 100% of Banco Safra. 

In 2019, Alberto stepped down from the bank’s administration and from his position on the Board to dedicate himself to personal projects. It was reported that he left after a dispute with his brother David over Banco Safra's expansion into retail banking. He then founded ASA Investments, a Sao Paulo-based asset-management firm with offices in Rio de Janeiro and New York. In 2022, ASA acquired CORE, a real estate fund.

The multimarket ASA Hedge, Alberto Safra's main fund, showed the best profitability in 2022 out of 188 funds monitored by Bloomberg,  and was ranked among the best in the market, reaching first place in September in the ranking published by UOL, with its profitability emphasized by G1 among multimarket funds with the highest return in 2022: 318% of CDI. ASA Hedge defied a trend of record redemptions for the Brazilian fund industry in 2022, recording around R$1.7 billion in net raising for the year, compared to R$84 billion in net redemptions in multimarket funds.

In October 2020, his father died leaving his fortune to his wife and four children. In 2021, he challenged three new wills his father executed in November and December 2019, arguing that his father lacked the mental capacity due to his suffering from advanced Parkinson's disease.

In January 2023, Bloomberg reported that Alberto Safra is close to reaching an agreement to sell his stake in Grupo J.Safra to his siblings.

Net worth
According to the Forbes list of The World's Billionaires, as of October 2021, his mother is worth $7.5 billion; and he and his siblings collectively are worth $7.3 billion making each individually a billionaire.

Personal life
In November 2006, he married Maggy Candi; they have 4 children: Vicky, Joseph Alberto, Freddy Alberto, and Lina.

References

1970s births
1980s births
Brazilian billionaires
Brazilian Jews
Safra family
Living people